The City of Violence (lit. "Partner" or "Pal") is a 2006 South Korean action thriller film co-written and directed by Ryoo Seung-wan, who stars in the film opposite action director and longtime collaborator Jung Doo-hong. The story re-unites former childhood friends for their friend's funeral, which prompts two of them to find the killer.

Plot
Wang-jae, an ex-gangster, chases a gang of punks into an alley where he is fatally stabbed to death. His four childhood friends reunite in nearly 20 years at Wang-jae's funeral. Up to then, each person has gone their own way: Tae-su became a Seoul police detective. Pil-ho has taken over his brother-in-law Wang-jae's business. Seok-hwan, who works as a debt collector while his older brother Dong-hwan struggles as a mathematics professor. After the funeral, Tae-su decides to investigate the murder within a week before he would return to his job in Seoul. 

Meanwhile, Seok-hwan decides to find and kill Wang-jae's murderers. While investigating, Tae-su is attacked by youth gangs, who use an array of weapons including baseball bats, hip hop, bikes, hockey sticks, and yo-yo's. Tae-su barely escapes with his life after Seok-hwan's unexpected arrival. They decide to work together. After hunting the gangs, they discover Wang-jae's death isn't a random mindless attack. It was a planned murder. The revelation leads them to Seok-hwan's own brother, who confesses a secret. It's Pil-ho who was behind the plan, which was hatched after Wang-jae disapproved Pil-ho's plans to turn their city into a tourist district. After strangers tried to kill him as part of tying up Pil-ho's loose ends, Wang-jae's young murderer agrees to testify against Pil-ho. A killer douses the young murderer in gasoline and sets him on fire. When Tae-su realizes there's no legal way to take Pil-ho down, he confronts Pil-ho, but he ends up badly beaten. 

Meanwhile, Seok-hwan, Dong-hwan and their mother are on their way to a restaurant when a truck smashes into their car. After Dong-hwan and his mother's funeral, Seok-hwan and Wang-jae's widow leave the funeral house and sees Tae-su waiting outside. Tae-su persuades Wang-jae's widow into revealing information on her brother Pil-ho's whereabouts. No longer bound by law, Tae-su and Seok-hwan storm Pil-ho's fortress where they fight their way through swarms of armed cooks and bodyguards until the banquet room. They witness Pil-ho killing a Seoul president, which prompts all guests to leave just Tae-su, Seok-hwan, Pil-ho and his four elite guards alone in the room. The elite guards immediately take Tae-su and Seok-hwan. 

Victorious but exhausted, Seok-hwan and Tae-su set to take on Pil-ho, but Pil-ho takes them by surprise by attacking Seok-hwan, who loses his fingers. Pil-ho turns and stabs Tae-su, ignoring Seok-hwan, who is binding the katana to his hand with torn table cloth. Tae-su informs Pil-ho that the last man who stands last wins. Before Pil-ho could react, Seok-hwan stabs him through the chest, killing him. As Tae-su bleeds to death, an exhausted Seok-hwan glances around, noting the carnage he and his late friend Tae-su had created, and sighs heavily.

Cast

Ryoo Seung-wan ... Yoo Suk-hwan 
Kim Shi-hoo ... Yoo Suk-hwan (young)
Jung Doo-hong ... Jung Tae-soo 
On Joo-wan ... Jung Tae-soo (young)
Lee Beom-soo ... Jang Pil-ho 
Kim Dong-young ... Jang Pil-ho (young)
Jung Suk-yong ... Yoo Dong-hwan
Park Young-seo ... Yoo Dong-hwan (young)
Lee Joo-shil ... Yoo Suk-hwan's mother
Ahn Gil-kang ... Oh Wang-jae
Jung Woo ... Oh Wang-jae (young)
Kim Byeong-ok ... Youth president
Kim Seo-hyung ... Jang Mi-ran
Jo Deok-hyun ... Boss Jo
Kim Gi-cheon ... Sal-soo
Kim Kkot-bi ... high school girl with razor blade
Kim Su-hyeon ... Seoul detective
Im Jun-il ... Team leader Im
Lee Na-ri ... Miss Bae
Park Ji-hwan ... teen gang boss
Lee Hong-pyo ... Onsung area cop
Oh Joo-hee ... hanbok-wearing woman in special room 2
Kim Hyo-sun ... secretary

Awards and nominations
2006 Chunsa Film Art Awards
 Best Supporting Actor - Lee Beom-soo

2006 Busan Film Critics Awards
 Best Cinematography - Kim Yeong-cheol

2006 Blue Dragon Film Awards
 Nomination - Best Supporting Actor - Lee Beom-soo

2006 Korean Film Awards
 Best Supporting Actor - Lee Beom-soo
 Nomination - Best Editing - Nam Na-yeong
 Nomination - Best Music - Bang Jun-seok
 Nomination - Best Sound - Seo Yeong-jun, Jo Min-ho

2007 Grand Bell Awards
 Nomination - Best Director - Ryoo Seung-wan
 Nomination - Best Supporting Actor - Lee Beom-soo
 Nomination - Best Cinematography - Kim Yeong-cheol
 Nomination - Best Editing - Nam Na-yeong

References

External links 
 
 
 
 
 

2006 films
2006 action thriller films
2006 crime thriller films
2000s crime action films
2000s buddy films
Films about organized crime in South Korea
Films directed by Ryoo Seung-wan
2000s Korean-language films
Police detective films
South Korean action thriller films
South Korean crime thriller films
South Korean crime action films
CJ Entertainment films
2000s South Korean films